Dhaka University Debating Society (DUDS, ডি.ইউ.ডি.এস.), is a student organization that is connected with the Bangladesh debate movement. According to the full guideline of Dhaka University authority this organization is working to spread debate by the students of Dhaka University. DUDS is economically supported by the senate of Dhaka University.

Executive committee

Activities 
 National Debate Festival
 Nafia Gazi  inter-department debate competition
 Inter-university Bengali debate competition
  Inter-university English debate competition
 Inter-college Bengali/English debate competition
 Inter-school Bengali/English debate competition
 Inter-dormitory Bengali debate competition
 Inter-dormitory English debate competition
 Publication
 Study circle
 Seminar
 Workshop
 Participation in National and international debating competition
 Celebration of special days and Exhibition debate

Associate organisations

Hall debating clubs
 Ekushe Debating Club
 F H Hall Debating Club
 F Rahnan Hall Debating Club
 Kabi Jashim Uddin Hall Debating Club
 Bangabandhu Hall Debating Club(BHDC)
 Zia Hall Debating Club
 Begum Fazilatunnessa Debating Club  
 Debate is a Debaters' Organization-Jagannath Hall
 Maitree Debating Club
 Mohsin Hall Debating Club
 Rokeya Bitorko Angan
 Shamsunnahar Hall Debating Club
 Shahidullah Hall Debating Club
 Sufia Kamal Hall Debating Club
 Surjo Sen Bitorko Dhara
 Salimullah Muslim Hall Debating Club
 House of Debaters-Sergeant Jahurul Haque Hall
 Bijoy Ekattor Hall Debating Club

Divisions/Department debating clubs
 Accounting debating club
 Marketing debating club
 C.S.C. D.U. debating club
 Nribiggan debating club
 M I S debating club
 Physics debating club
 Population sciences debating club
 EconDU Debate Wing
 and others

Institution debating clubs
 IIT debating club
 Socialwelfare debating club
 I.N.F.S. debating club
 Leather Technology institute debating club
 Health economics debating club

Membership and registration 
Any student of Dhaka University can be a member of DUDS according to the nature of this organization. They can join in English and Bengali sessions every week. Generally members are recruited at the start of the year. Members can be registered from different hall debating clubs or associated organizations.

Moderator panel
 Chief moderator - Mahbuba Nasrin
 Moderators - Tawhida Jahan, Didarul Alam, and Mehedi Hasan

Publication
Every year, DUDS publishes two annual publications, Protibak and Prottus for members. Commemorative books of the national debate festival are also published and some others publications.

References 

Debating
University of Dhaka